Ro 3-0419 is a highly toxic organophosphate acetylcholinesterase inhibitor. It is the neutral analog of Ro 3-0422. Although Ro 3-0419 is less potent than Ro 3-0422, it does not have a positively charged nitrogen atom, resulting in its ability to cross the blood brain barrier to inhibit cholinesterases in the brain. The intravenous  of Ro 3-0419 is 1 mg/kg in mice.

See also
Ro 3-0422

References

Acetylcholinesterase inhibitors
Organophosphates
Quinolines
Ethyl esters